Kushtia Government College is a traditional college in Kushtia District of Bangladesh. The college is located on a 5-acre land in a beautiful and pleasant environment inside the city of Kushtia. This college is affiliated with Bangladesh National University. The college was established on 1 January 1948. The reputation of the college has been jealous since its inception while it is one of the 30 first-class colleges in Bangladesh. Greater Kushtia and the surrounding region ensure education for the people of the role of this college is immense. The students and teachers of this college have played a role in the struggle of various movements, from the language movement to the great liberation war.

History of establishment 
The great initiative of local educationists and philanthropists established this college on 1 January 1948 for the betterment of education.

Campus 

In a pleasant environment surrounded by the trees, the students are in the 5 acre campus lively with five college buildings.

Amount of land 
The college has  land in total.

Students 
Today, the college has more than 22,000 students.

Departments 
The college have 19 different departments. Bangali, English, Economics, Politics, Social Science, Philosophy, History, History and Culture of Islam, Islamic Education, Physics, Chemistry, Zoology, Biology, Mathematics, Accounting, Management, Geography and Environment, Statistics, Information and communication technology

Of these, Honors courses are offered in 16 departments and Masters in 11 departments.

In spite those science, humanities and business education groups at the higher secondary level and science, humanities, social sciences and business education groups in the degree pass courses.

Hostels 
One boys hostel and one girls hostel can be found here.

Sports 
The college has facilities for cricket and football. There are also carrom and table tennis for the boys.

Voluntary organizations 
BNCC, Rover Scout, Red Crescent, Badhon etc.

References 

Educational institutions established in 1947
Coordinates on Wikidata
Colleges in Kushtia District
Universities and colleges in Kushtia District
1947 establishments in East Pakistan